The 1916 Villanova Wildcats football team represented the Villanova University during the 1916 college football season. The Wildcats team captain was F. Leo Lynch.

Schedule

References

Villanova
Villanova Wildcats football seasons
Villanova Wildcats football